Milan Đorđević (born November 5, 1968) is a Serbian slalom canoer who competed as an Independent Olympic Participant in the early 1990s. He finished 39th in the K-1 event at the 1992 Summer Olympics in Barcelona.

References 
 Sports-Reference.com profile

1968 births
Serbian male canoeists
Yugoslav male canoeists
Canoeists at the 1992 Summer Olympics
Living people
Olympic canoeists as Independent Olympic Participants
Sportspeople from Niš